Roberto Arsenio Luzardo Correa, commonly known as Arsenio Luzardo  (born 3 September 1959), is a former Uruguayan footballer.

Club career
Luzardo played for Club Nacional de Football, Recreativo de Huelva, LG Cheetahs, and US Biskra.

International career
He was in squad of Uruguay under-20 team at the 1979 FIFA World Youth Championship. He has also played with the senior team at the 1983 Copa América.

Honors

Player
Uruguay national football team
 Copa América Winner (1): 1983

Club Nacional
 Uruguayan Primera División Winner (2): 1980, 1983
 Copa Libertadores Winner (1): 1980

LG Cheetahs
 K League Runner-up (1): 1993
 League Cup Runner-up (1): 1992

Individual
 South America Youth Football Championship top scorer: 1979
 Copa Libertadores top scorer: 1983

External links
 
 

1959 births
Living people
People from Treinta y Tres
Association football midfielders
Uruguayan footballers
Uruguayan expatriate footballers
Uruguay under-20 international footballers
Uruguay international footballers
1983 Copa América players
Uruguayan Primera División players
Club Nacional de Football players
Segunda División players
Segunda División B players
Recreativo de Huelva players
K League 1 players
FC Seoul players
Expatriate footballers in South Korea
Uruguayan expatriate sportspeople in South Korea
Copa América-winning players
Copa Libertadores-winning players